The 2010 International German Open was a men's tennis tournament played on outdoor red clay courts. It was the 104th edition of the event known that year as the International German Open and was part of the ATP World Tour 500 series of the 2010 ATP World Tour. It took place at the Am Rothenbaum in Hamburg, Germany, from 19 July through 25 July 2010.

ATP entrants

Seeds

*Seedings based on the July 12, 2010 rankings.

Other entrants
The following players received wildcards into the singles main draw:
  Daniel Brands
  Tobias Kamke
  Julian Reister
  Mischa Zverev

The following players received entry from the qualifying draw:
  Simone Bolelli
  Björn Phau
  Rubén Ramírez Hidalgo
  Pere Riba
  Christophe Rochus
  Lukáš Rosol

Withdrawals
The following notable players withdrew from the event:
 David Ferrer
 Richard Gasquet (back/rib injury)
 Fernando González (knee injury)
 Gaël Monfils
 Juan Mónaco (wrist injury)

Finals

Singles

 Andrey Golubev defeated  Jürgen Melzer, 6–3, 7–5
 It was Golubev's first career title. He was the first man from Kazakhstan to ever win an ATP title.

Doubles

 Marc López /  David Marrero defeated  Jérémy Chardy /  Paul-Henri Mathieu, 6–3, 2–6, [10–8]

References

External links
  
   
 Association of Tennis Professionals (ATP) tournament profile

 
International German Open
Hamburg European Open
2010 in German tennis
July 2010 sports events in Germany